Battles is an American experimental rock group, founded in 2002 in New York City by Ian Williams (formerly of Don Caballero and Storm & Stress). The current line-up is a duo, composed of guitarist/keyboardist Williams and drummer John Stanier (formerly of Helmet, Tomahawk and The Mark of Cain). Former members include composer/vocalist Tyondai Braxton and guitarist/bassist Dave Konopka. The band has released four studio albums to date, with the most recent Juice B Crypts being released in 2019.

The band are regarded as one of the most innovative math rock bands of both the 2000s and the 2010s, with critics praising the band's unique sound. In 2007, Pitchfork wrote that "Battles have done more to extend the idea of a flesh-and-blood band enhanced by computer technology than anyone since the late, lamented Disco Inferno."

Career
Battles released two EPs, EP C, B EP, and the single "Tras" before signing to Warp Records. Warp compiled these early recordings and released them as an album, titled EP C / B EP,  in February 2006.

Their first studio album, Mirrored, was recorded by Keith Souza at Machines with Magnets, and released on May 14, 2007, preceded by a single, "Atlas". The single was the NME's Single of the Week, and went on to be number one in the Dandelion Radio Festive Fifty. The album received positive reviews and appeared on several top album lists for 2007. The group would go on to play at 2007's All Tomorrow's Parties festival and on BBC television's Later With Jools Holland. Before the end of the year they collaborated with United Visual Artists in a video for track "Tonto". Battles' music was used in video games such as LittleBigPlanet, short films, television programs, and on the soundtracks of films Twilight Saga: Eclipse and Big Fan in the following years.

Braxton left the group in August 2010, indicating that he did not wish to tour although Battles already had a touring schedule lined up for the upcoming year. Speaking about the split in 2013 to The Brag, Braxton pointed to a "long standing divide" between himself and his bandmates.

Battles' second album, Gloss Drop, was released on June 6, 2011 featuring guests including Gary Numan, Kazu Makino, and Yamantaka Eye, and the band announced a spring tour in support of the record. In December 2011 the band curated the All Tomorrow's Parties "Nightmare Before Christmas" festival in Minehead, England alongside co-curators Les Savy Fav and Caribou. From February to April 2012, a series of four 12" vinyl EPs were released, titled Dross Glop (a spoonerism of the album's title) 1 through 4, featuring dance remixes of all the songs on Gloss Drop by various artists, including Gui Boratto, Kode9 and Hudson Mohawke. A compilation album featuring the 11 remixes (plus one not included, "Sundome") was released on April 16, 2012.

Third album, In 2014, La Di Da Di, was released on September 18, 2015. This was preceded by a live session through Warp Records of them performing four new songs in New York City. The stream was up for 24 hours only, and was set on a constant loop.

Konopka left the band in 2018, although the news was not confirmed until May 2019. The band played their first show as a duo in July 2019, at the Dour Festival in Belgium. Their fourth album, Juice B Crypts, was released on October 18, 2019. It features collaborations with Shabazz Palaces, Liquid Liquid's Sal Principato, Xenia Rubinos, Jon Anderson of Yes and Tune-Yards' Merrill Garbus.

In December 2021, it was announced the band would tour North America in April and May 2022 as the opening act on Primus' A Tribute to Kings tour.

Members

Current members
 Ian Williams – guitar, keyboards, Ableton Push (2002–present); effects, bass guitar, loops (2018–present)
 John Stanier – drums, percussion (2002–present)

Former members
 Tyondai Braxton – guitar, keyboards, vocals (2002–2010)
 Dave Konopka – bass guitar, guitar, effects, loops (2002–2018)

Discography

Studio albums

EPs
 EP C (Monitor Records; June 8, 2004)
 B EP (Dim Mak Records; September 14, 2004)
 EPC (Japan only special mix edition; Dotlinecircle; October 2004)
 Lives (Beat Records; September 27, 2007)
 Tonto+ (Warp Records; October 22, 2007 world, November 6, 2007 USA)
 Dross Glop 1 (first in a four-part 12" vinyl remix series; Warp Records; February 6/7, 2012)
 Dross Glop 2 (second in four-part 12" vinyl remix series; Warp Records; February 20/21, 2012)
 Dross Glop 3 (third in four-part 12" vinyl remix series; Warp Records; March 19/20, 2012)
 Dross Glop 4 (fourth and final in four-part 12" vinyl remix series; Warp Records; Record Store Day, April 21, 2012)

Compilations
 EP C/B EP (Warp Records, February 21, 2006)
 Warp20 (Chosen) (September 28, 2009)
 Dross Glop (CD compilation of the four-part 12" vinyl remixes; April 16/17, 2012)

Singles
 "Tras" (June 15, 2004, 12")
 "Atlas" (April 2007, 12")
 "Tonto" (October 2007)
 "The Line" (August 2010, digital download)
 "Ice Cream" (March 2011, 12")
 "My Machines" (August 2011, 12")
 "The Yabba" (August 2015, download)
 "FF Bada" (September 2015, download)
 "Titanium 2 Step" (August 2019, download)

Music videos
"Atlas" (2007)
"Tonto" (2007)
"Ice Cream" (2011)
"My Machines" (2011)
"The Yabba" (2015)
"Dot Net" (2015)
"Titanium 2 Step" (2019)
"Fort Greene Park" (2019)
"Sugar Foot" (2020)

Filmography
 All Tomorrow's Parties (October 2009)
 Battles: The Art of Repetition (July 2015)

References

External links

 Official Battles website
 Battles fansite

Indie rock musical groups from New York (state)
American musical trios
Math rock groups
American post-rock groups
Musical groups from New York City
Musical groups established in 2003
Warp (record label) artists